The dupattā, also called chunni, chunari and chundari, is a long shawl-like scarf traditionally worn by women in the Indian subcontinent to cover the head and shoulders. The dupatta is currently used most commonly as part of the women's shalwar kameez outfit, and worn over the kurta and the gharara.

Etymology 
The Hindi-Urdu word dupattā (दुपट्टा, دوپٹہ), meaning "shawl of doubled cloth," derived from Middle Indic elements stemming from Sanskrit, is a combination of du- (meaning "two",  from Sanskrit dvau, "two" and dvi-, combining form of dvau) and paṭṭā (meaning "strip of cloth," from paṭṭaḥ),  i. e., scarf usually doubled over the head.

History 

Early evidence of the dupatta can be traced to the Indus valley civilization, where the sculpture of a priest-king whose left shoulder is covered with some kind of a chaddar suggests that the use of the dupatta dates back to this early Indic culture.
Early Sanskrit literature has a wide vocabulary of terms for the veils and scarfs used by women during the ancient period, such as avagunthana (cloak-veil), uttariya (shoulder-veil), mukha-pata (face-veil), and siro-vastra (head-veil). The dupatta is believed to have evolved from the ancient uttariya.

Use 
The dupatta is worn in many regional styles across South Asia. Originally, it was worn as a symbol of modesty. While that symbolism still continues, many today wear it as just a decorative accessory. There is no single way of wearing the dupatta, and as time evolves and fashion modernizes, the style of the dupatta has also evolved.
A dupatta is traditionally worn across both shoulders and around the head. However, the dupatta can be worn like a cape around the entire torso. The material for the dupatta varies according to the suit. There are various modes of wearing dupatta. When not draped over the head in the traditional style, it is usually worn with the middle portion of the dupatta resting on the chest like a garland, with the ends thrown over each shoulder. When the dupatta is worn with the shalwar-kameez, it is casually allowed to flow down the front and back. In current fashions, the dupatta is frequently draped over one shoulder, and even over just the arms. Another recent trend is the short dupatta, which is more a scarf or a stole, often worn with a kurti and Indo-Western clothing. Essentially, the dupatta is often treated as an accessory in current urban fashion.

In addition to wearing the dupatta when going out in public, South Asian women wear the dupatta when entering a mandir, mosque, dargah, church or gurdwara. It is also draped around the head, save for the eyes, as protection against pollution or the sun. In the context of the COVID-19 pandemic, it was not considered adequate for use as a cloth face mask.

A dupatta used as a covering for the head and face is called a ghoonghat in north India and Pakistan. In Nepal a dupatta or similar shawl is called a pachaura.

Gallery

References

External links
 

Scarves
Bangladeshi clothing
Indian clothing
Punjabi clothing
Pakistani headgear
Robes and cloaks
History of Asian clothing
Islamic female clothing